The Daleks are a fictional extraterrestrial race of mutants from the British science fiction television series Doctor Who. The mutated remains of the Kaled people of the planet Skaro, they travel around in tank-like mechanical casings, and are a race bent on universal conquest and destruction. They are also, collectively, the greatest alien adversaries of the Time Lord known as the Doctor, having evolved over the course of the series from a weak race to monsters capable of destroying even the Time Lords and achieving control of the universe.

Main history

Origins
The First Doctor first encounters the Daleks in the second serial of the show, The Daleks  (1963−64). In this version of Dalek history, the Dalek homeworld of Skaro is described by the Daleks in the second episode as having once been home to two humanoid races: the Daleks and the Thals. Following a short but terrible nuclear war between the races "over five hundred years ago", the Thals were horribly mutated and the "Dalek forefathers" retired into the city. According to the Thals in the third episode, the Daleks were originally teachers and philosophers, while the Doctor states in the fourth episode that the Daleks were called Dals back then, and speculates that the Daleks had just as badly been mutated at the time. They are more or less confined to their city; their motive power being electricity conducted via metal walkways. After discovering the anti-radiation drugs of the Thals kill them, the now-xenophobic Daleks decide to release radiation from their nuclear reactors into Skaro's atmosphere, leaving only the Daleks. However, the TARDIS crew convince the Thals to fight the Daleks to stop this. At the end of this serial, the Daleks are seemingly wiped out when their power source is destroyed. However, the popularity of the Daleks ensured their return.

Later stories
They next appeared in The Dalek Invasion of Earth (1964), which shows the Daleks having conquered and occupied the Earth in the mid-22nd century after a meteorite shower and a plague. The First Doctor explains the presence of the Daleks to his companions, Ian Chesterton and Barbara Wright, by saying that the events take place "a million years" before The Daleks, and that what they are witnessing is the "middle period" of Dalek history. However, these Daleks as an invasion force are able to move without the need for metal paths, drawing power through what appear to be radio dishes on their backs. The Daleks here plan to destroy the Earth's magnetic core and pilot the planet. However, the Doctor and his companions cause a rebellion in the mine workings, and the Dalek Saucer is destroyed by the bomb intended for Earth's core.

Over the course of their next few appearances, the Daleks developed time travel in The Chase (1965), where they use a time machine to pursue the TARDIS crew, before landing on the planet Mechanus and battling the robotic Mechanoids. Here, the radio dishes have vanished, replaced with slats around the midriff functioning as solar panels.

In the year 4000 (The Daleks' Master Plan, 1965–66), they have an interstellar Dalek Empire. In this story, the Daleks form an alliance with beings from the 'Outer Galaxies' in a plot to attack the Solar System with help from its treacherous Guardian Mavic Chen, who supplies them with Taranium for the Time Destructor. The First Doctor steals the Taranium during the final meeting on the planet Kembel, but the Daleks pursue him through time and space. They finally recover the Taranium and turn on the delegates, leading to Mavic Chen's death. However, the surviving delegates are released and go back to their own galaxies to warn them of the Daleks. The Doctor activates the Time Destructor and the Daleks are destroyed, though his companion Sara Kingdom is turned to dust.

The Daleks develop factory ships for conquest, as seen in The Power of the Daleks (1966). Daleks are revived after their ship has been in a swamp on the planet Vulcan for over 200 years. They recognise the newly regenerated Second Doctor. The Daleks join forces with a rebel group and with the colony's power source they begin producing more Daleks to exterminate the colony. However, the Doctor turns the power source against the Daleks and apparently destroys them.

A second attempt to end the Dalek saga was made in The Evil of the Daleks (1967), which also introduced a Dalek Emperor. In that story, the Daleks capture the Second Doctor and Jamie McCrimmon, planning to use them to discover the human factor. They plan to use this to find the Dalek Factor and spread it throughout human history. The conflagration caused by a Dalek civil war when Daleks are infected by the Human Factor is declared by the Doctor to be "the final end." This was because Terry Nation was in negotiations to sell the Dalek concept to American television. Although the sale did not succeed, the Daleks did not appear again for five years. An untransmitted line of dialogue in the original script for Day of the Daleks mentions the supposed final end, when one of the Daleks says that the humanised Daleks were wiped out by the true Daleks. However, the humanised Daleks would later appear in a comic strip (Children of the Revolution) in Doctor Who Magazine, issues #312–317.

The Daleks returned in the Third Doctor serial Day of the Daleks (1972), where once again they use time travel technology and rule the Earth in the 22nd century in an alternate timeline created by wars started by a Peace Conference being disrupted. The Doctor discovers the conference was disrupted by an attempt by guerillas from the future to assassinate Sir Reginald Styles, who was held responsible for disrupting the conference. The Doctor travels back to prevent this future, and, despite the Daleks travelling back to disrupt the conference, the delegates are saved, the Daleks destroyed, and the timeline negated. The Daleks were re-established as a species bent on universal conquest, as seen in Frontier in Space (1973) where the Daleks try to cause a war between Earth and Draconia with help from the Master. This leads directly into Planet of the Daleks (also 1973), where the Daleks have invaded the planet Spiridon and are attempting to find a way to become invisible. Later on, in Death to the Daleks (1974), the Daleks try to stop humans getting the cure to a plague from Exxilon. They are trapped on the planet with the Third Doctor and humans when the Exxilon City drains the power from their ships. However, the Third Doctor destroys the brain of the city while the Daleks and humans destroy the transmitter, and the Daleks are destroyed by a human sacrificing himself with a Dalek bomb. The Dalek Emperor is not in attendance; the Daleks being led by a Supreme Dalek instead, with references made to a Dalek High Council. Frontier and Planet are set in the 26th century, while Death refers to the recent "Dalek Wars".

Genesis of the Daleks

In 1975, Terry Nation retconned the Daleks' origins in the serial Genesis of the Daleks, where the Fourth Doctor was sent by the Time Lords to the moment of the Daleks' creation, to stop the Dalek race before it could begin or to lessen their dominance in the future.

The Kaleds (an anagram of Dalek) are a race of humanoid extraterrestrials and the forebears of the Daleks. The Kaleds, with their stylised salutes and authoritarian political structure, were thinly veiled analogues of the Nazis. In this serial, it was the Kaleds who waged war on the Thals. The Daleks originate during the Kaled-Thal War, which is portrayed as a thousand-year-long war of attrition, fought with nuclear, biological and chemical weapons, with weapons becoming progressively less sophisticated as resources became scarcer, not the short nuclear exchange previously described.

The crippled Kaled chief scientist and evil genius Davros deems the mutations from the fallout irreversible, and then experiments on living cells, treating them with chemicals and accelerating the mutations to discover the eventual mutated Kaled form and ensure its survival. The serial suggests that mutations among the general Kaled populace are not as advanced as implied by the earlier account, and that the development of the mutated creatures that become the Daleks is engineered by Davros for his own purposes. Ostensibly, he is only speeding up the process, to predict the final form of the Kaled mutation; seeing its helplessness, he devises the means for his race's continued existence. Ultimately, he uses his creations to prematurely replace the non-mutated members of his race with the Daleks.

These genetically conditioned forms are placed in Mark III "travel machines" whose design is based on his own life-support chair. The tank-like travel machines coupled with the mutants become the first Daleks.

The Doctor leads other Kaled scientists to try to shut down the Dalek project. To prevent this, Davros arranges for the Thals to wipe out his own people. The Daleks are then sent to exterminate the Thals, but later turn on Davros and apparently kill him.

While a group of surviving Thals wire the Kaled research bunker with explosives, the Doctor has the opportunity to fulfil his mission and destroy the Daleks at their genesis, but when the time comes, the Doctor could not perform what he sees as an act of genocide. He believes that despite the horror, evil and destruction that the Daleks would inflict on the universe, ultimately there must be 'some greater good'.

He later returns to the incubation chamber and does destroy the Dalek embryos, but afterwards, the Doctor concludes that this action, together with the Thals' sealing them in the bunker, had only slowed their progress by a thousand years at most. The Discontinuity Guide by Paul Cornell, Martin Day and Keith Topping argues that the Doctor did succeed in changing Dalek history. However, other commentators argue that it is possible to reconcile the pre- and post-Genesis stories without the need to invoke two versions of Dalek history. "Asylum of the Daleks" (2012) shows that Daleks still encountered the Doctor on Spiridon, Kembel, Aridius, Vulcan, and Exxilon, implying that the pre-Genesis stories still took place.

Post-Genesis history
In Destiny of the Daleks (1979), it was revealed that Davros had survived the Daleks' attack and lived on, buried in a bunker in suspended animation. During the time Davros was sleeping, the Daleks began sending recon scouts as revealed in "Resolution" (2019) to locate planets for the Daleks to conquer.

In time, the Daleks completely abandoned Skaro and established a vast interstellar empire while ultimately ending up in a stalemate with a hostile android race called the Movellans. This forces the Daleks to send an expedition to the ruins of Skaro to recover Davros to give them the advantage with a Movellan expedition sent to stop them. The Daleks succeed in reviving Davros, who theorises that the extreme intelligence and rationality of the battle computers are to blame and that the first side to take a seemingly reckless gamble would tip the balance in their favour. However, the Fourth Doctor intervenes and prevented either the Dalek or Movellan expeditions from returning with this insight. Davros falls into the hands of a human space empire and is put back in suspended animation for indefinite imprisonment. This impasse continues for nearly a century until the Movellans developed a highly virulent biological agent that targets Dalek DNA. This forces the Dalek to retrieve Davros in the events of Resurrection of the Daleks to have him develop a defense against the disease. But Davros uses this to take personal command of the Daleks in an act of betrayal, causing a schism among the Daleks between one faction following Davros' leadership and another rejecting their creator to instead follow the Supreme Dalek.

By the time of Revelation of the Daleks (1985), Davros is in hiding at the Tranquil Repose funeral facility on the planet Necros, experimenting with physically transforming humans into Daleks. He is also placing those Daleks loyal to him into white and gold casings to distinguish them from the usual black and grey Daleks, but his plans are undone when a worker at the facility contacts the original Daleks. These Daleks arrive on Necros, exterminate the white and gold Daleks and capture Davros, who is returned to Skaro to face trial. The main Dalek army Davros had hidden is destroyed by a bomb the assassin Orcini set off, sacrificing himself in the process.

Civil War
Davros made his next televised appearance in the serial Remembrance of the Daleks (1988). Apparently, events had taken place off-screen, as he appears in the guise of the Dalek Emperor, leading his gold and white Imperial Daleks with control over Skaro. Davros had at this point modified the Imperial Daleks, adding cybernetic enhancements to their organic components. A new model "Special Weapons Dalek" was introduced with an enormously powerful cannon and armour capable of deflecting regular Dalek weaponry. Also, for the first time, a Dalek was clearly seen on screen to hover up a flight of stairs.

Pitted against the Imperial Daleks are the Renegade Daleks, led by a black Supreme Dalek. The name "renegade" suggests that the tables had turned and Davros' side had the upper hand. Both Dalek factions become aware that the Hand of Omega, a Gallifreyan stellar engineering device, was hidden on Earth in the year 1963. Both factions send expeditions to Earth, battling each other to retrieve it, hoping to use the Hand to create a power source that would refine their crude time travel technology.

Ultimately, the Imperial Daleks succeed, not knowing that the Seventh Doctor had inserted a booby trap into the Hand's programming. When Davros activates it, Skaro's sun goes supernova, and both the Dalek homeworld (in the future) and the Imperial Dalek fleet are destroyed. Davros, however, apparently escapes his flagship's destruction in an escape pod. The Renegade Supreme Dalek self-destructs when the Doctor informs it that it has failed and is the last of its kind. Remembrance of the Daleks marked the last on-screen appearance of the Daleks in the context of the show until 2005, save for charity specials like Doctor Who and the Curse of Fatal Death and the use of Dalek voices in the Doctor Who television movie.

The Master on Skaro
In the 1996 Doctor Who television movie, the Master is seen being put on trial on Skaro. The Daleks are heard, but not seen, exterminating the Master—or so the Doctor initially thought—after sentence is passed for his "evil crimes". Before they do this, however, the Eighth Doctor narrates that the Master makes a "last, and [he] thought somewhat curious, request" for the Seventh Doctor, near the end of his incarnation, to take the Master's remains back to Gallifrey.

Time War and aftermath
A new Doctor Who series was announced for 2005 and the Daleks have appeared in every series since (as of series 11). In the first series of the revival, the Daleks serve as the main antagonists. In "Dalek" (2005), it was revealed that the Daleks were involved with the Time Lords in a Time War, in which both sides were believed to have been practically wiped out. The Ninth Doctor encounters a surviving Dalek who somehow fell through time to 20th century Earth. By 2012, it had passed into the hands of American billionaire Henry van Statten, who dubs it a "Metaltron" and keeps it in a secret underground museum called the Vault along with other alien artefacts. The Dalek is damaged, remaining silent and helpless until the Ninth Doctor arrives at the Vault. Absorbing DNA from the Doctor's companion Rose Tyler, it regenerates itself and goes on a killing spree. However, having absorbed Rose's DNA, it continues to mutate and finds itself beset with unfamiliar, human feelings. Realising it is now "contaminated", the mutant asks Rose to order it to destroy itself, rather than continue to live in that way. It then disintegrates itself with an energy field created by the spheres along its lower casing.

The new Time War Daleks exhibit abilities not seen before, including a swivelling midsection that allows it a 360-degree field of fire and a force field that disintegrates bullets before they strike it. In addition to the ability to fly, it is also able to regenerate itself by means of absorbing electrical power and the DNA of a time traveller. The "plunger" manipulator arm is also able to crush a man's skull in addition to the technology interfacing abilities shown by earlier models. The laser is shown to be conducted like electricity, when the Dalek fires in a wet metal room. The Doctor describes the Dalek as a "genius", able to calculate a thousand billion lock combinations in a single second and to download the entire contents of the Internet. A more sophisticated model of the Dalek mutant was also shown.

The two-part 2005 series finale, comprising "Bad Wolf" and "The Parting of the Ways" revealed that this Dalek was, in fact, not the sole survivor of its race. The Emperor Dalek's ship had also survived, falling through time much as the lone Dalek did. Hidden, it began to rebuild, infiltrating Earth society over the course of centuries and using human genetic material to create a new Dalek race. Having done this, the Dalek Emperor came to see itself as a god, and built its new society around the Daleks' worship of itself. The new Daleks, because of origin as being spawned from impure genetic material, became as mad as their creator and even more dangerous as a result, with the Doctor adding their silence over the centuries to be partly responsible for it.

Subtly manipulating the Fourth Great and Bountiful Human Empire of the year 200,000 by means of news programmes transmitted from Satellite 5 in Earth orbit, the Daleks installed the monstrous Jagrafess as mankind's keeper. The Ninth Doctor removes the Jagrafess in "The Long Game", but was unaware that the Daleks were behind it. Over the next hundred years, the Daleks continued their scheme, recreating Satellite Five as the Game Station, acquiring more humans for mutation by subjecting them to twisted reality television games. The station's Controller transports the Ninth Doctor and his companions into the station, where the Doctor discovers the Dalek presence. The race, now numbering close to half a million, are poised to invade Earth with a fleet of 200 ships. The Daleks attack Earth, destroying entire continents.

The Doctor builds a Delta Wave projector that would wipe out the Daleks, but would also eliminate all life on one side of the Earth, and finds himself unable to trigger it. However, Rose absorbs energies from the spacetime vortex by staring into the heart of the TARDIS and uses those energies to pilot the TARDIS back to the Doctor and reduce the Daleks and their fleet to atoms.

The Cult of Skaro

In the 2006 series finale, "Army of Ghosts" and "Doomsday", it was revealed that members of the Cult of Skaro had also escaped during the Time War by going into the nothingness between dimensions – the Void – taking with them a Time Lord prison, dubbed the Genesis Ark, which contains millions of Daleks. The Daleks' Void ship finally emerges on 21st century Earth, where it is examined by the Torchwood Institute. The path of the void ship also leaves a breach in spacetime that allows the parallel Earth Cybermen to cross over into the Doctor's universe.

The Daleks reject the Cybermen's proposal for an alliance to conquer the universe and the Ark is opened, releasing millions of Daleks to wage all-out war against the Cybermen across the planet. Ultimately, both armies are sucked back into the Void due to the actions of the Tenth Doctor. However, Sec is seen activating an "emergency temporal shift" before being sucked in. The following series reveals that Caan, Thay and Jast were also able to escape in the same fashion.

Ending up in New York in 1930 during the episode "Daleks in Manhattan" (2007), after a failed attempt to restart their species via cloning, Sec hatches a plan of evolving the species into a new race that would adapt to the changing times, noting that despite their quest for perfection, their race is close to extinction. To that end, he telepathically contacts a human, Mr Diagoras, to serve as their servant in finishing the Empire State Building and reinforcing it with Dalekanium metal. The other Cult members (Dalek Thay, Dalek Caan, and Dalek Jast) are assigned to capture humans, which would be split into two groups. Through a quick brain scan, the Daleks determine the intelligence of each captured human. The more intelligent humans become part of the Final Experiment, while the less intelligent are transformed into pig slaves, humanoid creatures with pig-like faces, to capture more humans. The Final Experiment involves Dalek Sec making the ultimate sacrifice, and despite objections from his comrades, Dalek Sec envelops Diagoras in his tentacles and encases him in a stomach-like pouch in the process absorbing Diagoras which later transforms Sec into a new species of Hybrid Dalek, a Human Dalek.

In the second part of the story, "Evolution of the Daleks" (2007), while having the Tenth Doctor as his captive, Sec reveals that his transformation is the first part of the Final Experiment. The next stage involves the introduction of his hybrid DNA into thousands of captured and mind-wiped humans, whose DNA would be spliced through gamma radiation from the Sun, channelled into the Empire State Building and into the transgenic laboratory where the bodies are held. Notable changes come to this plan upon the transformation of Dalek Sec who is filled with new emotions. He believes that a return to their biological roots is necessary and even makes peace with the Daleks' nemesis the Doctor, and asks for his help in relocating the new Dalek species. However, Sec fails to realise the Dalek imperative for racial purity among his comrades, who turn on him and replace his genetic sample with their own so the Dalekised humans would wipe out humanity and transform Earth into New Skaro. Sec is killed and the Daleks' plans fall into ruin when their Dalek army is corrupted with Time Lord DNA. Daleks Thay and Jast are killed, leaving the new commander, Dalek Caan, the only survivor as he terminates the Dalek-Human army by remote, killing the newly born species. The Doctor attempts to show mercy to Caan despite everything, but the Dalek initiates an emergency temporal shift to escape.

New Dalek Empire
In "The Stolen Earth" (2008), both Davros and a red Supreme Dalek are seen as rulers of the New Dalek Empire. It is revealed that Caan forced himself into the Time War to save Davros from destruction at the Gates of Elysium. He took his creator to safety, but the ordeal from forcing himself into the time-locked moment allowed him to "see all of time", although it left him insane but able to predict about a forthcoming showdown with the Tenth Doctor. While Davros provides scientific and strategic guidance, he is still essentially subservient to the Supreme Dalek. Davros used cells from his own body to create a new race of Daleks which begin stealing planets from across time and space, creating an artificial solar system. They are arranged in such a way that they uniquely channel energy that can be harnessed. These planets are placed in the rift in the Medusa Cascade, which is set a second out of sync from time, making it the perfect hiding place. Follow-up episode "Journey's End" (2008) shows Davros gloating that his plan is to destroy reality itself. "The Crucible" is revealed to be a gigantic space station that houses the entire empire and is used for experimentations with Davros' invention, the reality bomb. The bomb is a device that uses the energy of the 27 planets, and is powerful enough to cancel out even the slightest atoms outside of the Medusa Cascade. The Supreme Dalek plans to use this device to destroy reality itself, using Davros' genius and Caan's prophetical powers for guidance. Ultimately, the Daleks hope to make themselves the sole living race in the universe. The interference of the Doctor and his companions stops Davros' plans, who learns that Caan engineered it so the Daleks would be destroyed forever. With the Crucible exploding from all the Daleks self-destructing and the Supreme Dalek destroyed, the fates of both Davros and Caan are left ambiguous. In "The Waters of Mars" (2009), Adelaide Brooke recalls how a Dalek spared her life during the 2009 invasion. The Tenth Doctor concludes that the Dalek knew she was a fixed point in time, and thus could not kill her without threatening the laws of time. Subsequently, in 2009–2010 two-part special "The End of Time", the Time Lords nearly escape the Time Lock, which would also release the horrors of the Time War upon the universe once again, including the full Dalek Empire, but this eventuality is averted by the Tenth Doctor.

New Dalek Paradigm
In "The Beast Below" (2010), a Dalek shadow can be seen during Prime Minister Winston Churchill's telephone conversation with the Eleventh Doctor. In "Victory of the Daleks" (2010), it is revealed that a Dalek ship survived its previous encounter with the Doctor, and fell back through time to 1941. The ship appears to be badly damaged, with only three surviving Daleks on board, "at the end of [their] rope". The surviving Daleks discovered that a Progenitor, a small capsule containing pure Dalek DNA, had also fallen back through time. The Daleks retrieved it, planning to create a new race of Daleks, but were unable to activate the capsule, as it couldn't recognise these Daleks and, according to the Eleventh Doctor, saw them as "impure". To solve this problem, they set a trap for the Doctor. This trap consists of building an android who believes himself to be human working undercover for the war cause. He claims to have invented the Daleks, calling them "Ironsides". With Dalek blueprints and multiple Daleks painted in British Army Khaki, Winston Churchill uses them as war weapons, although they are mostly seen to be carrying around files and asking staff, "Would you care for some tea?" The Eleventh Doctor is surprised as these khaki Daleks appear to have forgotten their own purpose. This is all part of their plan, however: he proclaims, "I am the Doctor, and you are the Daleks!" which the Daleks back on the ship use as a testimony to activate the progenitor. The five New Paradigm Daleks that appear then exterminate their predecessors with no resistance, as they were deemed inferior. Each Dalek is a different colour and each represents a specific place in Dalek Hierarchy — Drone, Scientist, Strategist, Eternal and Supreme. The Daleks activate a time corridor, and escape into the future, delaying the Doctor by threatening to destroy Earth. Amy Pond doesn't recognise the Daleks when she first meets them, despite the Daleks' invasion of Earth and the planets appearing in Earth's sky, which the Doctor says is not possible. In "Flesh and Stone" (2010), the Eleventh Doctor theorises that the cracks in the universe caused the events to be unwritten.

The White Supreme Dalek, Yellow Eternal Dalek and Red Drone Dalek reappear in "The Pandorica Opens" (2010) as part of the Alliance. They are present at the opening of the Pandorica and the Supreme Dalek reveals the origin behind the Pandorica, the Alliance and Stonehenge before the Eleventh Doctor is imprisoned in the Pandorica prison. In follow-up episode "The Big Bang" (2010), after all of reality becomes cracked, the Daleks turn to stone due to their history being erased. A Stone Dalek is later seen at a museum with the Pandorica, and is awoken when it gets hit by the regenerative field of the Pandorica. It pursues and shoots the Doctor, but due to its power being weak, it was not a fatal shot. However, River Song, enraged and believing the Doctor to be dead, aims her gun at the Stone Dalek, knowing that its defences were weak. She later claims that the Dalek died, but it is not shown onscreen whether it did. By the end of the episode, the Doctor reverses the explosion of the TARDIS and the collapse of reality. A Dalek briefly appears in "The Wedding of River Song" (2010), having been heavily damaged by the Eleventh Doctor, who then rips its dome off and scans its data core for information about the Silence. This Dalek is the same design as the New Paradigm Daleks.

In "Asylum of the Daleks" (2012), the Eleventh Doctor, Amy Pond and Rory Williams are captured and taken to the Dalek Parliament, where they are ordered to 'save the Daleks' by the Dalek Prime Minister and enter the Asylum of the Daleks, which is a planetary prison surrounded by an impenetrable force-field containing battle-scarred and insane Daleks. They are tasked with an impossible and suicidal mission: to infiltrate the planet and disable the force-field so that the Daleks can destroy the Asylum, stopping the prisoners from escaping. Whilst seeking a way to disable the force-field, the trio meet Oswin Oswald, who has a suspiciously vast amount of access to the Asylum and is able to 'hack' Dalek technology to help guide the trio's way through the Asylum. When the Doctor enters a room called 'Intensive Care', he is faced with all of the battle-scarred Daleks who had survived the Doctor's interference throughout many battles. The Doctor's presence wakes them up with the intention of exterminating him, but Oswin hacks into the path-web (a psychic layer which all Daleks use to communicate with each other) and performs a 'master delete' on all information connected to the Doctor. This causes all Daleks to forget the Doctor, not recognising him while he returns to the Dalek ship to boast about his escape from the Asylum.

"The Day of the Doctor" (2013), set during the final day of the Time War, revealed that instead of Gallifrey and the Time Lords burning when the Dalek fleet was wiped out, 13 incarnations of the Doctor actually froze Gallifrey in a "parallel pocket universe"; its sudden disappearance causing the Daleks to destroy themselves in the crossfire as they concentrated fire on the planet, though the time streams being out of sync meant the Doctor did not retain his memory until his eleventh incarnation; earlier on in the episode, both the Tenth and the Eleventh Doctors mistakenly believe that the War Doctor killed all of the Time Lords on the last day of the Time War.

During the centuries-long siege of Trenzalore during "The Time of the Doctor" (2013), upon learning of the Time Lords' survival with the intent to resume the Time War, the Daleks regain their memories of the Doctor after probing the mind of Mother Superior Tasha Lem of the Church of the Papal Mainframe. The Daleks end up being the last of the Doctor's enemies to besiege Trenzalore as everyone else had either retreated or been destroyed. The Daleks nearly finish the Eleventh Doctor, now a frail old man with no regenerations left, once and for all on Trenzalore as history dictated. However, due to the pleas of Clara Oswald, the Time Lords intervene, granting the Doctor a new regeneration cycle. The Doctor promptly starts regenerating and uses his excess regeneration energy to obliterate the Dalek forces on Trenzalore.

In "Into the Dalek" (2014), the Doctor, regenerated into his twelfth incarnation, encounters a rebel group engaging the Dalek force with a damaged one in their custody. Hearing the Dalek spout a desire to destroy its kind, the Doctor minimises himself to enter the Dalek the Doctor refers to as "Rusty" with Clara and a team of soldiers. After it is revealed the malfunction was due to an internal radiation leak, Rusty relapses once repaired and summons a Dalek platoon to destroy the rebel station. Still inside Rusty, convinced by Clara there is still a chance while having her restore memory of the Dalek's newfound morality, the Doctor manages to connect with Rusty's consciousness to cement its ideals. However, Rusty's change of heart is instead fuelled by seeing the Doctor's anger and complete hatred towards the Dalek race, destroying the platoon before returning to the Dalek ship to act on its new mission incognito.

The Daleks return on a rebuilt Skaro in "The Magician's Apprentice" (2015), where the Twelfth Doctor, the Master, who now goes by "Missy", and Clara have been taken. The Daleks take Missy and Clara prisoner in the city, and appear to exterminate Missy and Clara after toying with them. In the following episode, "The Witch's Familiar" (2015), it is revealed that Missy and Clara survived the Daleks' blasts through the modified vortex manipulators they were wearing using energy from the gunstick blasts at the last moment before impact. In the episode, Davros tricks the Doctor into using up his regeneration energy to heal Davros and the Dalek race as part of a plan to fulfil a prophecy about the creation of a Dalek-Time Lord hybrid. However, Missy releases the Doctor from capture, and the Doctor reveals that he willingly bluffed Davros into letting the Doctor heal the Daleks, as the regeneration energy also awakens the liquefied and rotting Dalek mutants from the city sewers. The sewer Daleks revolt against the Daleks in the city above by entering the city through the city pipes and bury the city. Surrounded by Daleks in the collapsing city, Missy tells the Daleks that she has a "very clever idea".

After a brief cameo in "The Pilot" (2017), a special type of Dalek known as a Recon Scout Dalek appears in 2019's "Resolution", to face off against the Thirteenth Doctor and companions Graham, Yaz and Ryan; the latter accompanied by his estranged dad. When its casing was destroyed in an ancient battle and the mutant is unearthed in an archaeological dig centuries later, the Doctor arrives to investigate, but not before the mutant attaches itself to one of the archaeologists. Using said archaeologist as a puppet, the Dalek mutant gathers together enough scrap materials to construct a temporary casing, which it uses to flee to GCHQ in a plan to summon the Dalek fleet and conquer Earth. The Doctor stops this plan and destroys the Dalek's temporary casing, but the mutant attaches itself to Ryan's dad and blackmails the Doctor to take it to Skaro. The Doctor complies, but actually takes the mutant to a supernova and sucks it out into space, detaching it from Ryan's dad in the process and destroying it.

The Daleks next appeared in "Revolution of the Daleks" (2021), in which a "Dalek Death Squad" arrives on Earth to wipe out a force of "impure" Daleks created by the British government. Next, the Daleks made several cameos in series 13 before returning as the main villains of another New Years Special, "Eve of the Daleks" (2022).

Spin-off media
The Daleks have appeared in many Doctor Who spin-offs, sometimes opposing the Doctor and sometimes on their own.  All these spin-offs are of uncertain canonicity, and not all of them can be easily reconciled with the television series or with each other. Where they fit in the Dalek timeline is also uncertain.

Comic strips

The first appearance of the Daleks beyond the television series was in The Dalek Book (1964), an illustrated volume written by Terry Nation and David Whitaker. It tells the story of a Dalek invasion of Earth's solar system. Here it is claimed Skaro has moved into Earth's Solar System. Later stories showed Sara Kingdom, presumably meaning they take place in the latter 40th Century. Here the Daleks make attempts to invade the Solar System and the Space Security Service is founded to defeat them. In 1965, the comic book TV Century 21 began publishing The Daleks, which was written by Whitaker and included an account of the Daleks' origins. (The comic strip was, years later, collected together in an edition titled The Dalek Chronicles).

The TV 21 strips portray the opposing sides in Skaro's war as the Thals and the Daleks, shown as diminutive blue men with large heads somewhat similar in appearance to Dan Dare's Mekon. The Thals are a peaceful race who live on the continent of Davius. Across the Ocean of Ooze, the Daleks inhabit Dalazar. According to the comic, these humanoid Daleks build neutron bombs which are accidentally detonated by a meteorite storm. (The idea of the war having an accidental, rather than deliberate origin, goes back to an earlier draft of the first Dalek television story.) The Daleks' chief scientist, Yarvelling, had built Dalek casings as war machines prior to the nuclear holocaust. After the neutron bombs explode, Yarvelling and Zolfian, the warlord of the humanoid Daleks, explore their continent and contract radiation sickness. They discover that a mutated Dalek had survived in the war machine casing. This Dalek persuades Yarvelling and Zolfian to build more Dalek casings for their mutated descendants. Before the last two humanoid Daleks die, it declares itself the Dalek Emperor, and has a new casing built to reflect its new rank, slightly shorter than the other Daleks, with a disproportionately large spheroid head section and in gold rather than grey.

Later stories in the Dalek comic tell of the expansion of the Daleks' empire, including a lengthy war against the Mechanoids which is averted by a robot sent from another planet. In the last published comic in this series, the Daleks learn the location of Earth, which they propose to invade. Although much of the material in these strips directly contradicted what was shown on television later, some concepts like the Daleks using humanoid duplicates and the design of the Dalek Emperor did show up later on in the programme.

The Doctor Who Magazine comic strips such as Nemesis of the Daleks (DWM #152-#155) pit the 26th century Daleks against the formidable Dalek Killer Abslom Daak and several more times against the Doctor. Emperor of the Daleks! (DWM #197-#202) reveals the Sixth Doctor deliberately rescues Davros from his trial (at the end of Revelation of the Daleks) and that the Seventh Doctor (with help from Bernice Summerfield and Daak) helps ensure Davros obtains control of the thousands-strong Dalek army frozen on Spiridon and began the Dalek civil war that would lead to the events of Remembrance of the Daleks.

The Eighth Doctor faces the Daleks twice in the pages of Doctor Who Magazine: once in Fire and Brimstone (DWM #251–255) to stop them from taking control of all realities and a second time in Children of the Revolution (DWM #312–317) when he encounters the humanised Daleks created in The Evil of the Daleks, who were in hiding on the planet Kryol.

Novels
The Virgin New Adventures add background detail to both the Dalek Wars of the 26th century and the Daleks' 22nd-century invasion of Earth, including detailing the events of the Dalek conquest of Mars (and a battle against the Ice Warriors) at that time in GodEngine (1996) by Craig Hinton.

The 1997 Eighth Doctor Adventures novel War of the Daleks by John Peel is set after the apparent destruction of Skaro in Remembrance of the Daleks, and reveals that the planet had not, in fact, been destroyed. A convoluted explanation includes the revelation that the planet Antalin had been terraformed to resemble Skaro and destroyed in its place. It is also revealed that the Dalek-Movellan war (and indeed most of Dalek history before the destruction of "Skaro") was actually faked for Davros' benefit. Having discovered records of Skaro's destruction during their invasion of Earth, and after their attempts to change history failed, the Daleks created an elaborate deception to save Skaro by moving Davros to Antalin and faking the situation to maintain history. Davros is put on trial by the Daleks under the Dalek Prime and disintegrated at story's end, and the Eighth Doctor sends their factory ship back in time to be discovered by the Second Doctor in The Power of the Daleks.

The Eighth Doctor faces the Daleks again in Legacy of the Daleks (1998), when he returns to Earth in the aftermath of the Dalek Invasion, although in this case the Daleks are basic versions who have been reactivated by the Master (whom the Doctor unintentionally confronts out of sequence), the novel concluding with the Daleks being destroyed and the Master being left in the condition that he was seen in during The Deadly Assassin.

The 2004 Telos novella The Dalek Factor by Simon Clark features a Dalek task-force using an amnesiac Doctor to trap and genetically re-engineer Thals with the "Dalek Factor" (the thoughts and instincts of a Dalek) so they can spread it throughout the Thal gene pool. Once this is accomplished, the Daleks plan to trigger the factor, wiping out the Thals by turning them into Daleks. The 2006 New Series Adventures novella I am a Dalek by Gareth Roberts has the Daleks attempting the same stratagem on humans during the Time War, but on a smaller scale that infects only one 20th century human.

In the 2009 novel Prisoner of the Daleks, the Tenth Doctor crosses into the pre-Time War Dalek timeline by accident, and lands in the 26th century; references are made to a recent conflict with the Draconians from Frontier in Space and the Osterhagen Principle, named after a UNIT weapon from Journey's End, is said to have been invented 500 years before. In this period of history, the pre-Time War Dalek Empire is fighting a huge galactic war against Earth, with Earth Command forced to hire bounty hunters to help them.  However, despite the Daleks having superior technology, the war has reached a stalemate. To win the war, the Daleks plan to open the Arkheon Threshold, a schism in time and space, and launch a huge Dalek force into the time vortex to conquer the whole of time and space. They capture a fleet of ships escaping from a colony planet and force them to work on breaking through to the Threshold with manual labour. Their plan is however defeated when the Doctor lures them to an abandoned refuelling planet where the TARDIS is located—the Daleks needing the TARDIS to make the experiment work—and then detonates the remaining fuel stores, destroying a Dalek science squad and a small Dalek fleet. The novel ends with the Earth forces overwhelming the Dalek forces at the Arkheon Threshold, and Earth going on the offensive.

In 2013, another novel, The Dalek Generation, was released. It shows that in the future, the Daleks, after a galactic recession, have helped develop planets for humanity which are called the Sunlight Worlds. These Daleks work with the Dalek Time Controller, a character from the Big Finish audios, to manipulate the Eleventh Doctor into helping them activate the Cradle of the Gods, a device with which they hope to turn the Sunlight Planets into copies of Skaro. However, the Doctor is able to foil their plan with the help of the Dalek Human Jenibeth, although the Dalek Time Controller escapes.

Engines of War (2014) features the War Doctor crash landing on a Dalek-occupied planet, Moldox, where he meets a Dalek hunter called Cinder. This story introduces a group of five Daleks called the Eternity Circle created by the Dalek Emperor. The Daleks plan to create a Temporal Cannon powered by the energy harnessed from the Tantalus Eye to wipe Gallifrey from history. They are defeated when the Doctor tells Borusa to destroy all Dalek traces around the Eye.

Audio plays
The Daleks also appear without Davros in many of the Doctor Who audio plays by Big Finish Productions.  The first four Doctor Who audio plays starring the Daleks were released under the "Dalek Empire" banner, and portrays a territorially expansive Dalek army under the command of the Emperor (who does not appear to be Davros). In The Genocide Machine (2000), the Daleks invade the Kar-Charrat Library to learn information they eventually use in The Apocalypse Element. In that play, the Daleks invade the Time Lords' home planet, Gallifrey, but are eventually defeated. They also use the eponymous "apocalypse element" to burn an entire galaxy, Seriphia, and plan to conquer the now-empty galaxy and use it as a new base for their empire. The third play, The Mutant Phase (2000), has few links with the others in the series and occurs around the time of The Dalek Invasion of Earth, where the Fifth Doctor becomes caught up in the Daleks' attempts to investigate a strange 'virus' that is mutating the Daleks into indestructible giant insects; after a confrontation with the Dalek Emperor of the far future, the events of this story are erased at its conclusion when the Emperor accepts the Doctor's warnings. The final story, The Time of the Daleks (2002), shows that the Daleks have gained much greater knowledge of time travel from their invasion of Gallifrey, attempting a complex plan to subvert human history by manipulating the timeline of William Shakespeare until the Eighth Doctor traps their fleet in a time loop of its own destruction.

A spin-off series of audios, titled Dalek Empire (2001–08), is set after The Time of the Daleks and features a successful Dalek invasion of the Milky Way during an Earth Empire. The Daleks make great headway and manage to conquer their way up to Earth's solar system in a prolonged war against both humans and the Daleks of an alternate reality. They are finally defeated by a psychic attack that causes every piece of Dalek machinery to self-destruct in an ever-expanding wave that obliterates their forces and kills the Emperor. However, this also cripples civilisation of the Milky Way and sets galactic development back by a substantial amount. Centuries later, when only a handful remember the Daleks, the Dalek Empire attacks again under the command of a Dalek Supreme, which infects the borders of the galaxy with a virus that genetically re-engineers humans into Daleks. By the end of the third Dalek Empire series, the Daleks have a new giant army and are poised to go to war with the Galactic Federation, with the outcome uncertain.

The 2003 Big Finish audio Jubilee depicts an alternate Earth in which the Sixth Doctor had helped defeat a Dalek invasion in 1903. Most of the story is set a hundred years later, in a world in which Dalek technology and ideals have been used to create a fascist and sexist "English Empire".  This timeline is largely erased at the story's end, but the Sixth Doctor warns that this nightmarish history will "live on, in the shadows". Jubilee was written by Robert Shearman, who used elements of it—such as the Doctor's companion bonding with a lone Dalek—for his 2005 television episode, "Dalek".

The 2004 Bernice Summerfield audio Death and the Daleks features the Daleks of the 26th century secretly controlling the Fifth Axis, a military force based on ideals of human superiority and the extermination of aliens, using them as proxies to conquer various worlds the Daleks did not wish to be seen conquering, including the Braxiatel Collection. Through the efforts of Benny Summerfield and her allies, the Axis is defeated and the Dalek control exposed.

In The Juggernauts (2005), set between Revelation of the Daleks and Remembrance of the Daleks, the Daleks manipulate the Sixth Doctor for the purpose of recapturing Davros (who had escaped his Dalek captors after the end of Revelation). Davros adds human nervous tissue to robotic Mechonoids to create the Juggernauts of the play's title; he hopes to use these as an army to destroy the Daleks. At the end of the story, the self-destruct mechanism of Davros' life-support chair explodes after it is damaged by a conflict between the Daleks and the Juggernauts, destroying an entire human colony. It is not clear how Davros survives to become the Dalek Emperor, as seen in Remembrance.

By the time of the 2005 Eighth Doctor audio play Terror Firma (set after Remembrance), Davros is commanding a Dalek army which has successfully conquered the Earth.  His mental instability has grown to the point where "Davros" and "the Emperor" exist within him as different personalities. His Daleks recognise this instability and rebel against Davros. By the story's end, the Emperor personality is dominant, and the Daleks agree to follow him and leave Earth.

The 2006 Seventh Doctor audio Return of the Daleks, set during the first Dalek Empire spin-off series, features the Daleks and Kalendorf trying to awaken their army buried on Spiridon, only for the Doctor to thwart their plans by infecting them with light-wave sickness when they attempt to recreate their old experiments to master the secret of invisibility.

In Blood of the Daleks, the Eighth Doctor and new companion Lucie Miller arrive on the colony world of Red Rocket Rising, recently decimated in a meteor strike, just as a Dalek fleet arrives offering to 'help' the survivors. The Doctor soon realizes that the Daleks were actually drawn to Red Rocket Rising to destroy the experiments of Professor Martez, who created his own race of Daleks by mutating human subjects. The two factions of Daleks soon turn on each other out of their own belief in their superiority, the Doctor convincing Martez to destroy the production line for Martez's Daleks while the original Daleks are too damaged by recent battles to prevent their ship being destroyed by a bomb.

Enemy of the Daleks sees the Seventh Doctor facing an experiment on the planet Bliss that attempted to create a race able to oppose the Daleks, known as the Kisaabya. Genetically engineered to eat metal as adults and flesh as larvae, their creator intended for the Kisaabya to eat the casings of the Daleks, lay their eggs in the Dalek mutants, and then have their larvae eat the mutant creatures. Feeling that the Kisaabya are too dangerous and uncontrollable, the Doctor works with the damaged Black Dalek to position itself beside the reactors of the base where the experiments took place so that the Black Dalek's self-destruct will destroy the base and the entire Kisaabya species.

The 2012 audio Energy of the Daleks sees the Fourth Doctor and Leela deal with a Dalek attack on Earth in the mid-twenty-first century, where the Daleks—originating from the future—intend to exploit a device intended to provide Earth with free energy to disrupt Earth's gravity field and seriously damage the planet. The Doctor is able to sabotage their equipment and destroy the Dalek ship.

The Fourth Doctor faces the Daleks again in the two-part audio The Dalek Contract / The Final Phase, when they trick ruthless CEO Cuthbert into hiring them as a security force while he attempts to complete his mysterious experiment, which will turn a rift in the universe into a time portal. The Daleks intend to use this rift for their own benefit, but the Doctor is able to configure the rift to generate a massive pulse of temporal energy that destroys all Dalek DNA in its vicinity.

The Eighth Doctor and Lucie face the Daleks again when the Daleks attempt a second invasion of Earth (Lucie Miller/To the Death) aided by the Doctor's old friend-turned-foe the Monk, seeking revenge for the Doctor's past defeats of him. The Monk eventually realizes his mistake when the Daleks destroy the collection of human cultural artefacts he had been assembling and kill his companion Tamsin Drew (who had initially travelled with the Doctor before the Monk manipulated her into 'defecting' to his side), but the Daleks are still responsible for the deaths of Lucie and the Doctor's great-grandson, Alex Campbell, when they give their lives to destroy the Dalek mothership, the Monk only just saving the Doctor and Susan from the same fate.

The Lost Stories audio The Elite features a single damaged Dalek that has manipulated a civilization into a state of civil war after it became trapped on a primitive planet, the Dalek posing as an emissary of the gods. The Fifth Doctor prepares to take the Dalek back to the fleet to give the civilization a chance to rebuild, but the Dalek is killed by one of its followers as the priest cannot accept the truth.

The audio series Dark Eyes and its sequels are essentially the first stages of the Time War in the modern series, depicting the Daleks' early attempts to destroy the Time Lords through various complex schemes involving alliances with factions such as the renegade Time Lord Kotris and the powerful Eminence, opposed by the Eighth Doctor and his new companions Molly O'Sullivan and Liv Chenka.

In The Curse of Davros, the Daleks, collaborating with Davros, attempt to alter the outcome of the Battle of Waterloo, using a device that allows Davros to transfer Dalek minds into human bodies. The Sixth Doctor uses this to swap bodies with Davros to try and sabotage the Dalek plan from within, but is only jus able to regain his body with the aid of his new companion Flip Jackson.

In Masters of Earth, the Sixth Doctor arrives on Earth during the Dalek invasion, and is forced to help a woman who will become a famous figure in the anti-Dalek resistance in the future escape to the Orkney islands while keeping his true identity secret. In the end, the Doctor is forced to end a plan to augment humanity with elite Roboman technology as he fears that the transformation would make mankind the new Daleks.

In Daleks Among Us, a faction of Daleks attempt to acquire the Persuasion Machine, a machine that allows the user to control others, with this faction being led by Falkus, a clone of Davros's original human body that has gained sentience. The Daleks and Falkus are destroyed when the Doctor's companion Elizabeth Klein is able to take control of the machine.

In We Are the Daleks, the Seventh Doctor discovers that the Daleks are attempting to infiltrate human society in 1987 by presenting themselves as being interested in a partnership with Earth for economic purposes. They are able to brainwash all of London into adhering to a Dalek philosophy, but the Doctor turns the tables on them when he sends the transmitter of the brainwashing signal back to Skaro, causing the Daleks to turn of themselves as their existing Dalek feelings are amplified.

The audio series The War Doctor and Eighth Doctor- Time War depict the events of the Time War between the Time Lords and the Daleks, with the Eighth Doctor acting as a conscientious objector focused on helping those caught in the crossfire of the war, while the War Doctor takes the battle to his enemies using increasingly questionable and dangerous methods as he rejects his usual name and methods.

In the audio series Doctor Who: The Third Doctor Adventures- The Conquest of Far (set just after "Planet of the Daleks"), the Third Doctor (voiced by Tim Treloar) and Jo arrive on the distant Earth colony of Far, where the Doctor once aided in the construction of a hypergate providing rapid access to distant systems, only to discover that the Daleks have conquered the planet and intend to use the gate for themselves. With the aid of local resistance and a nearby space fleet, the Doctor is able to avert the Daleks' plan to use an augmented Robomen program to take control of humanity, modifying the equipment to shut down the Daleks' minds rather than control the humans'.

Video games
The Progenitor Daleks who first appeared in "Victory of the Daleks" return as the main antagonists of the first game of Doctor Who: The Adventure Games, City of the Daleks (2010). Following their escape, the Daleks discover the lost Time Lord artefact, the Eye of Time, allowing them to alter time as they saw fit with few consequences. The Daleks return to Skaro, rebuild their capital city of Kaalann, appoint a new blue Dalek Emperor and begin rebuilding their Empire. One of the Daleks' first acts with their newfound power over time is to invade London in 1963. In this new timeline, they succeed in killing every member of the human race. However, the Eleventh Doctor and Amy Pond successfully undo these events, leaving Earth unconquered and Kaalann still abandoned.

A Scientist Dalek is the main antagonist of the game Mazes of Time. It kidnaps an alien family to collect Time Orbs. It recruits Drones and Strategist Daleks. It also recruits big armies of Cybermen and Silurians as a distraction for the Eleventh Doctor and Amy Pond.

The Paradigm Daleks return as one of the antagonists of the Eternity Clock game (2012). A new Dalek Emperor is leading the invasion of Earth in 2106 using the piece of the Eternity Clock. The Emperor is purple and able to form itself as a sphere. The Daleks are using the piece of the Eternity Clock to put a Time-Lock around a large part of London in 2106. Once they perfected their Time-Lock technology, they planned to use it to put temporal bubbles around other planets, making them unstoppable. The Doctor and River Song infiltrate the Dalek Flagship and managed to take back the piece, undoing the Dalek invasion.

See also
 Dalek variants
 Dalek comic strips, illustrated annuals and graphic novels
 Dalekmania

References

Daleks